USS Joseph Hewes may refer to the following ships of the United States Navy:

, was acquired by the US Navy 8 January 1942 and sunk 11 November 1942
, was a  launched 7 March 1970 and transferred to Taiwan in 1999

United States Navy ship names